Bill Payne (born 21 December 1967) is a retired American pole vaulter.

He won the silver medal at the 1991 Summer Universiade, and competed at the 1995 World Championships without reaching the final.

His personal best is 5.86 metres, achieved in May 1991 in Houston. This result secures him a place on the all-time list in pole vault, and places him thirteenth on the American all-time list behind Jeff Hartwig, Timothy Mack, Toby Stevenson, Brad Walker, Lawrence Johnson, Scott Huffman, Joe Dial, Dean Starkey, Jacob Davis, Nick Hysong, Kory Tarpenning and Earl Bell.

He is married with four children. His daughter, Demi Payne, is also a pole vaulter, one of the top ten female vaulters in history.

References

1967 births
Living people
American male pole vaulters
Universiade medalists in athletics (track and field)
Universiade silver medalists for the United States
Medalists at the 1991 Summer Universiade